Gringalet  is a 1959 Argentine film directed by Rubén W. Cavalloti and written by Rodolfo M. Taboada from the play by Paul Vandenberghe. It was released by Argentina Sona Films.

Plot summary 
A young painter from the La Boca neighborhood discovers that his father is a millionaire, goes to live with him, changes his life and returns to his neighborhood.

Cast 

 Walter Vidarte
 Graciela Borges
 Raúl Rossi
 Beatriz Taibo
 Juan Carlos Barbieri
 Maruja Gil Quesada

Reception
Clarín reviewed the director: "Rubén Cavallotti is steadfast as a narrator".

La Razón wrote, "Narration without major aspirations. He transplants pieces of reality onto the screen, but much of what is seen is not new in our cinema".

A Variety review summarized it as a "yarn concerns a light hearted youth in poor circumstances whose fortune improves". The review noted the film's occasional humor, said that Walter Vidarte was miscast as Gringalet, and called the film "an artificial production".

References

External links
 

1959 films
1950s Spanish-language films
Argentine black-and-white films
Argentine films based on plays
Films directed by Rubén W. Cavallotti
Argentine drama films
1950s Argentine films